Writing Excuses is a podcast hosted by authors Dan Wells, Brandon Sanderson, Mary Robinette Kowal, and author and web cartoonist Howard Tayler.

Promoted as "fifteen minutes long, because you're in a hurry, and we're not that smart", the four hosts and guests discuss different topics involved in the creation and production of genre writing and webcomics. As of 2017, authors Wesley Chu, Piper J. Drake and  Mary Anne Mohanraj were added as secondary hosts, each having one show a month alongside different configurations of the primary hosts.

Premise

Writing Excuses began in 2008 with three hosts – Sanderson, Tayler, and Wells – accompanied by Brandon's brother, Jordan Sanderson, who serves as producer. The show aims to cover a single writing-related topic in each podcast, in a format short enough to be listened to on a morning commute or during a lunch break. Adherence to a fifteen minute limit is not absolute, and Writing Excuses frequently runs to about 20 minutes.

The single topic is discussed in a back-and-forth by the hosts for roughly fifteen minutes. Given the authors' backgrounds in fantasy and science fiction there is a strong emphasis in those genres, but Writing Excuses covers a wide variety of topics intended to apply to fiction and creative arts generally. Halfway through the podcast the hosts introduce a book of the week, either a favorite of the hosts or one of their own works. Writing Excuses was sponsored by Audible from October 2009 through July 2016, after which it became listener-supported. On numerous occasions, often at conventions, the hosts invite guest authors and industry professionals on board for podcast episodes.

After making a number of guest appearances, Mary Robinette Kowal joined the permanent cast as a new host at the beginning of season 6.

Wesley Chu, Piper J. Drake, and  Mary Anne Mohanraj were added as secondary hosts at the beginning of series 12.

Awards
The Writing Excuses podcast has received the following recognition:

Shadows Beneath anthology

Shadows Beneath, an anthology of four stories written by the members of Writing Excuses, was published in 2014. The anthology's bonus material is intended to show some of the processes of story creation. The stories were brainstormed on the podcast and the first drafts later critiqued. Transcripts of the podcasts and one or more drafts of the stories are included. The stories are illustrated by Kekai Kotaki, Kathryn Layno, Ben McSweeney, Rhiannon Rasmussen-Silverstein, and Tayler.

The anthology was released as a hardcover and an ebook in July 2014 through Dragonsteel Entertainment. The stories include:
 A Fire in the Heavens, by Mary Robinette Kowal
 I.E. Demon, by Dan Wells
 An Honest Death, by Howard Tayler
 Sixth of the Dusk, by Brandon Sanderson

Reception
Eric Seal of Nitwitty Magazine stated that "no other book on writing...offers a wealth of writing knowledge in such a consumable form." GraphicAudio described it as "an exhaustive look at the entire process [of writing]". MySF Reviews described the behind-the-scenes part of the book as "the most interesting thing about this collection". The anthology was a preliminary nominee for the Hugo Award for Best Related Work in 2015, but did not make the final ballot.

References

Audio podcasts
Educational podcasts
2008 podcast debuts
Hugo Award for Best Related Work-winning works